The University of Udine (Italian Università degli Studi di Udine) is a university in the city of Udine, Italy. It was founded in 1978 as part of the reconstruction plan of Friuli after the earthquake in 1976. Its aim was to provide the Friulian community with an independent centre for advanced training in cultural and scientific studies and it is an important centre for the studies of Friulian language.

The University is actively involved in student and staff exchange projects with universities within the European Union, Australia and Canada, and is currently engaged in close collaboration with several universities from Eastern Europe and other non-EU countries. Moreover, the University participates in many research projects at national and international level. The present number of students enrolled at the University for the academic year 2020/2021 is 14,986.

Organization
These are the 8 Departments (from the January 1st 2017) in which the university is divided into:

 Department of Economics and Statistics (DIES)
 Department of Food, Environmental and Animal Sciences - (DI4A)
 Department of Languages and Literature, Communication, Education and Society - (DILL)
 Department of Law Sciences (DISG)
 Department of Humanistic Studies and Cultural Heritage - (DIUM)
 Department of Mathematics, Computer Science and Physics (DMIF)
 Department of Medical Sciences and Biology (DSMB)
 Polytechnic Department of Engineering and Architecture - (DPIA)

Rectors 
 1978-1979: Antonio Servadei
 1979-1981: Mario Bonsembiante
 1981-1983: Roberto Gusmani
 1983-1992: Franco Frilli
 1992-2001: Marzio Strassoldo
 2001-2008: Furio Honsell
 2008-2013: Cristiana Compagno
 2013-2019: Alberto Felice De Toni
 2019-current: Roberto Pinton

Notes and references

External links 
  
University of Udine International Students Services 
Friuli Innovazione Science and Technology Park of Udine

1978 establishments in Italy
University of Udine
Buildings and structures in Udine
Friuli
Florence Network
Educational institutions established in 1978
Education in Friuli-Venezia Giulia